Aldwarke is an industrial area in South Yorkshire, England. It is in the Eastern suburbs of Rotherham. Aldwarke is east of the neighbouring suburb of Parkgate and 1.9 miles (3.1 km) north-east of Rotherham town centre. There is a large steelworks factory in the immediate area. Aldwarke Lock is on the Don Navigation Canal, which runs parallel to the River Don.

External links

Villages in South Yorkshire